Ahmadabad-e Korbal (also Romanized as Aḩmadābād-e Korbāl; also known as Aḩmadābād) is a village in Kheyrabad Rural District, in the Central District of Kharameh County, Fars Province, Iran. At the 2006 census, its population was 576, in 136 families.

References 

Populated places in Kharameh County